Alston Moor is a civil parish in the Eden District, Cumbria, England.  It contains 88 buildings that are recorded in the National Heritage List for England.  Of these, 
three are listed at Grade II*, the middle grade, and the others are at Grade II, the lowest grade.  The parish contains the market town of Alston, the villages of Garrigill and Nenthead, smaller communities, and the surrounding countryside.  Nenthead was surrounded by mines, particularly for lead, and some of the listed buildings in and around the village are associated with this industry.  Otherwise, most of the listed buildings are houses and associated structures, shops, public houses, hotels, and churches in and around Alston.  There is a series of milestones provided for the local turnpike trust.  The other listed buildings include a wayside cross, bridges, a former brewery, a former mill, former railway station buildings, a market cross, municipal buildings, two war memorials, and a memorial pump.


Key

Buildings

Notes and references

Notes

Citations

Sources

Lists of listed buildings in Cumbria